LTSA may refer to:

Local tangent space alignment, a nonlinear dimensionality reduction method
Land Title and Survey Authority in British Columbia, Canada
Land Transport Safety Authority, a former government entity in New Zealand, preceding Land Transport New Zealand
Latin Tropical/Salsa Airplay, a Billboard music chart
Lyceum Tourism Students Association, of Lyceum of the Philippines University
Labelled Transition System Analyser, a verification tool for concurrent computer systems
Long Term Service Agreement, an agreement to provide service over a number of years
 Last Time Seen Alive